Jerry Davis may refer to:

 Jerry Davis (American football) (1924–2006), American football defensive back
 Jerry Davis (politician), Texas politician
Jerry Davis (screenwriter), American director, producer and screenwriter

See also  
 Jerome Davis (disambiguation)
 Gerry Davis (disambiguation)